Galetown is an unincorporated community in Sandusky County, in the U.S. state of Ohio.

History
Galetown once had its own schoolhouse.

References

Unincorporated communities in Sandusky County, Ohio
Unincorporated communities in Ohio